J-League Winning Eleven 2010 Club Championship is an addition to the Winning Eleven J-League series. This game is the successor to the J-League Winning Eleven 2009 Club Championship and was released exclusively in Japan August 5, 2010. It features an updated engine from PES 2010. The game only features club teams (no national teams) and teams from both tiers of the J. League totalling 36 teams. The game also features 118 foreign teams from the Premier League, Ligue 1, Serie A, Eredivisie, Primera División and a selection of teams from other leagues. This game will become the last edition of J-League Winning Eleven series.

References

External links
 J-League Winning Eleven 2010 Club Championship, Konami Japan (Japanese)

2010 video games
J.League licensed video games
Japan-exclusive video games
PlayStation 2 games
PlayStation 2-only games
Pro Evolution Soccer
Multiplayer and single-player video games
Video games developed in Japan